This is a list of the main villages on the coral islands of Tokelau. There are no bigger settlements in Tokelau.

Villages
Tokelau